The Divorce of Lady X is a 1938 British Technicolor romantic comedy film produced by London Films; it stars Merle Oberon, Laurence Olivier, Ralph Richardson and Binnie Barnes. It was directed by Tim Whelan and produced by Alexander Korda from a screenplay by Ian Dalrymple and Arthur Wimperis, adapted by Lajos Bíró from the play Counsel's Opinion by Gilbert Wakefield. The music score was by Miklós Rózsa and Lionel Salter and the cinematography by Harry Stradling.

The film is a remake of the 1933 film Counsel's Opinion, also from London Films and in which Binnie Barnes appeared in the role played by Merle Oberon.

Plot
Party guests at a smart London hotel are stranded by a thick evening fog. All rooms end up being taken. Leslie Steele, a young, pretty but madcap socialite, barges her way into Everard Logan's suite. He promptly registers one objection after another, but all of his efforts to evict Leslie are to no avail. He thus agrees to a compromise, allowing her use of the bedroom, while he takes another room in the suite. She spends the entire time teasing and taunting him.

By breakfast, Logan changes his tune and insists they meet again. But while he's out of the room, dressing, she mysteriously bolts for home, which she shares with her grandfather/judge. He informs her that Logan is a barrister specializing in divorce cases. The zany, impulsive Ms. Steele then tells her grandfather she intends to marry Logan. To her surprise, she learns that Logan will be pleading a case before her grandfather's court that day. So she attends the proceeding to observe her intended in action – and to her further surprise, sees him mercilessly rip to shreds a woman accused of adultery.

As Leslie and Everard spend the rest of the film struggling to adjust to each other's whims and differences, a subplot involving Lord Mere, one of Logan's clients, is interwoven into the complicated story-line. A confusion of identities ensues, as at one point, Logan is led to mistakenly believe that Leslie is actually Lord Mere's wife. But after a weekend fox hunt at the lord's manor, all conflicts are satisfactorily explained away, and the two lovers are reconciled.

By the story's end, Leslie has successfully transformed Everard from the inhumane, hostile, woman-browbeating counselor she witnessed earlier into an empathetic, understanding, sensitive courtroom-interrogator of "the gentle sex".

Cast
Merle Oberon as Leslie Steele
Laurence Olivier as Everard Logan
Binnie Barnes as Claire, Lady Mere
Ralph Richardson as Lord Mere
Morton Selten as Lord Steele
Victor Rietti as hotel manager
J. H. Roberts as Slade
Gertrude Musgrove as Saunders, the maid
Gus McNaughton as room service waiter
H. B. Hallam as Jefferies, the butler
Eileen Peel as Mrs. Johnson
Lewis Gilbert as Tom

Critical reception
A reviewer for Variety wrote: "Alexander Korda's Technicolored comedy is rich, smart entertainment", and also praised the acting: "Oberon impresses. Olivier does his role pretty well, retarded somewhat by an annoying bit of pouting business. Two key performances which sparkle are those of Ralph Richardson and Morton Selten". whereas several decades later, Leonard Maltin described the film as a "Cute but extremely dated screwball comedy,"; and the Radio Times found the whole thing "quite amusing...in a daft and inconsequential way".

Emanuel Levy gave the film a "C" grade and wrote that "Though opulent in color costumes and design, this minor British screwball comedy is mostly known for its on-screen teaming of two young actors, Laurence Olivier and Ralph Richardson, in their pre-Hollywood era, who would become legendary stars".

References

External links

1938 romantic comedy films
1930s color films
British romantic comedy films
Films shot at Denham Film Studios
London Films films
Remakes of British films
British films based on plays
Films directed by Tim Whelan
Films scored by Miklós Rózsa
Films produced by Alexander Korda
Films with screenplays by Ian Dalrymple
Films about divorce
Films set in London
1930s British films